The Atlin Volcanic Field, also called the Llangorse Volcanic Field and the Surprise Lake Volcanic Field, is a group of late-Pleistocene to Holocene cinder cones that lies on the Teslin Plateau east of Atlin Lake, Canada.  The largest volcanic feature is the 1880-m-high Ruby Mountain which has been partially dissected by Pleistocene and post-Wisconsin glaciation.  Two basaltic cinder cones at the heads of Cracker Creek and Volcanic Creek lie within glacially dissected U-shaped valleys and may be of postglacial age.

November 8, 1898, eruption
A Yukon newspaper reported in 1898 that an eruption was occurring near Atlin about 80 km south of Gladys Lake.  Miners working in the area reportedly were able to work during the dark nights, due to the glow of the eruption.  The article also reported that a group of people were going down from the Yukon to investigate the eruption, but no further reports were apparently made. Several recent studies, including a summary by Edwards et al. (2003) published by the Geological Survey of Canada, have determined that Ruby Mountain was definitely not the site of a historic eruption, nor were the Cracker Creek or Volcanic Creek cones.

One possible explanation for the story is that placer miners found gold-bearing gravels beneath an ancient lava flow at the base of Ruby Mountain, and were actively tunneling under the old lava flow to mine the gravels. As its name suggests, Ruby Mountain is ruby-colored due to the scoriaceous tephra that covers much of its summit and the summer sun shining off of the ruby-red flanks of the volcano may have started the rumour. There have been no evidence of the eruption found in the region and the 19th-century report is considered uncertain.

Volcanoes 
Volcanoes within the field include:

 Volcanic Creek Cone
 Cracker Creek Cone
 Ruby Mountain
 Llangorse Mountain

See also
Northern Cordilleran Volcanic Province
List of volcanoes in Canada
Volcanism of Canada
Volcanism of Western Canada
Volcanic history of the Northern Cordilleran Volcanic Province

References 

Volcanic fields of Canada
Cinder cones of Canada
Northern Cordilleran Volcanic Province
Atlin District
Quaternary British Columbia
Cenozoic British Columbia